Marysia Zalewski is an academic associated with feminist approaches to international relations theory. She is a professor of international relations in the School of Law and Politics at Cardiff University. Previously, she was a professor and head of the School of Social Science (2011-2014) at the University of Aberdeen.

She graduated from the University of East Anglia with a degree in politics in 1988.

Books
International theory: positivism and beyond, co-edited with Steve Smith and Ken Booth, Cambridge University Press, 1996.
The "man" question in international relations, co-edited with Jane Parpart, Westview Press, 1998.
Feminism after postmodernism: Theorising through practice, Routledge, 2000.
Rethinking the man question: Sex, gender and violence in international relations, co-edited with Jane L. Parpart, Zed Books, 2008.
Feminist international relations: Exquisite corpse, Routledge, 2013.

External links
Cardiff University - Professor Marysia Zalewski
University of Aberdeen - Professor Marysia Zalewski

Living people
Alumni of the University of East Anglia
British international relations scholars
Academics of the University of Aberdeen
Year of birth missing (living people)
Women political scientists